Lord Loveland Discovers America is a 1916 silent movie that was made by the American Film Manufacturing Company at their Flying "A" Studios in Santa Barbara, California. The movie is based on a 1910 best-selling novel by Charles and Alice Williamson.

Plot
Plagued by creditors, but with no money to pay his debts, Lord Loveland (Arthur Maude) leaves England and sails to the United States hoping to find a wealthy heiress to marry. During the voyage, he makes friends with a lady playwright named Leslie Dearmer (Constance Crawley), whom he likes, but believing her not to be the wealthy heiress he seeks, he is reluctant to develop their friendship further. Leslie likes Loveland also and tries to help him after the ship arrives in port.

Unfortunately, they part unexpectedly when Loveland joins a theater troupe and suddenly leaves town, hoping that he can make some quick money as the troupe tours across the country. But when the troupe performs one of Leslie's plays without her permission, she tracks them down, not realizing that Loveland is among them.

Finally catching up with the troupe, Leslie is surprised and overjoyed to find Loveland once again, and she gives him a job driving her car. Although Loveland still intends to marry a millionaire, he falls in love with Leslie, and after she tells him that she actually is an heiress, both their dreams come true when he asks her to marry him.

Cast
Arthur Maude
Constance Crawley
William A. Carroll
George Clancey
Nell Franzen
William Frawley (film debut)
Charles Newton

References

External links

1916 films
American silent feature films
Films directed by Arthur Maude
Films based on British novels
1916 drama films
Silent American drama films
American black-and-white films
American Film Company films
Films based on works by Alice Williamson
1910s American films
1910s English-language films